Cancer Discovery is a monthly peer-reviewed medical journal published by the American Association for Cancer Research. It covers research and clinical trials related to the study of cancer. The editors-in-chief are Lewis C. Cantley and Luis A. Diaz.  The journal was established in 2011.

Abstracting and indexing
The journal is abstracted and indexed in:

According to the Journal Citation Reports, the journal has a 2020 impact factor of 39.397.

References

External links

Oncology journals
English-language journals
American Association for Cancer Research academic journals
Monthly journals
Publications established in 2011